Marius Iftimiciuc (born 13 August 1997) is a Romanian rugby union football player. He plays as a lock for professional Fédérale 1 club CA Périgueux.

Club career
Marius Iftimiciuc mostly played for SuperLiga club, Timișoara Saracens, with a brief move to Dinamo București during first half of 2018.

International career
In November 2018, he was called for Romania's national team, the Oaks, being part of the 34 man squad assembled in preparation for a match against the Os Lobos held for the Relegation/Promotion Play-Off of the 2018 Rugby Europe Championship.

References

External links

 Marius Iftimiciuc at Timișoara Saracens website (in Romanian)

1997 births
Living people
Romanian rugby union players
SCM Rugby Timișoara players
CS Dinamo București (rugby union) players
Rugby union locks
Romania international rugby union players